The 2011 South Carolina State Bulldogs football team represented South Carolina State University in the 2011 NCAA Division I FCS football season. The Bulldogs were led by tenth year head coach Oliver Pough and played their home games at Oliver C. Dawson Stadium. They are a member of the Mid-Eastern Athletic Conference. They finished the season 7–4, 6–2 in MEAC play to finish in a tie for second place.

Schedule

References

South Carolina State
South Carolina State Bulldogs football seasons
South Carolina State Bulldogs football